Barbara Robinson (October 24, 1927 – July 9, 2013) was an American author and writer of the children's books; The Best Christmas Pageant Ever (1972) and  The Best School Year Ever (1994).

Biography
Barbara Robinson was born and raised in Portsmouth, Ohio, and had no brothers or sisters. Her father died when she was three. Robinson's mother, a schoolteacher in Portsmouth for forty-nine years, got her interested in books, and she began writing very early. Robinson attended Allegheny College, where she received a bachelor's degree in theater.

In addition to her children's books, Robinson wrote many short stories in publications such as McCall's, Redbook and Ladies Home Journal, and has some books of poetry.

Robinson lived in Berwyn, Pennsylvania, a suburb of Philadelphia. She died July 9, 2013, at her home in Berwyn. She was 85 and had cancer. Robinson had two daughters with her husband John F. Robinson: Carolyn and Marjorie; three grandchildren: Tomas, Marcos, and Lucas.

Works

 Across from Indian Shore, illustrated by Evaline Ness (Lothrop, Lee & Shepard, 1962) 
 Trace through the Forest (Lothrop, 1965) 
 The Fattest Bear in the First Grade, illus. Cyndy Szekeres (Random House, 1969) – picture book
 Temporary Times, Temporary Places (Harper & Row, 1982) 
 My Brother Louis Measures Worms and other Louis stories (Harper, 1988) 

The Herdmans

 The Best Christmas Pageant Ever, illus. Judith Gwyn Brown (Harper, 1972); global title The Worst Kids in the World 
 The Best School Year Ever (Harper, 1994) 
 The Best Halloween Ever (HarperCollins Joanna Cotler Books, 2004)

References

External links
 official website (web.archive.org 2014-07-19) 
 

1927 births
2013 deaths
Allegheny College alumni
American children's writers
Deaths from cancer in Pennsylvania
People from Chester County, Pennsylvania
People from Portsmouth, Ohio
Writers from Pennsylvania
American women children's writers
20th-century American writers
21st-century American writers
20th-century American women writers
21st-century American women writers